Kediri Regency is a regency (kabupaten) located in East Java province, Indonesia. It is one of two 'Daerah Tingkat II' that has the name 'Kediri' (The other is the City of Kediri). It covers an area of 1,523.92 km2 and had a population of 1,499,768 as of the 2010 census and 1,635,294 at the 2020 census, comprising 825,867 males and 809,427 females.

The capital of the regency is at the town of Ngasem, near to the border of Kediri city, just about 200 m. However, several regency government establishments are also located within Kediri city, administratively a distinct political entity. This is because both the regency and the city share common cultural and historical roots, and the administrative division occurred only after the War of Independence. The regency shares borders with Jombang Regency to the north, Malang Regency to the east, Blitar Regency and Tulungagung Regency to the south, and Nganjuk Regency to the west, while Kediri city is wholly surrounded within the Regency. Kelud mountain, one of the most active volcanoes in Indonesia, is partially administered by the Government of Kediri Regency (along with Blitar Regency).

The regency also contains the famed "Kampung Inggris", or English Village.  Kampung Inggris is a small area in the district of Pare where over a hundred businesses offering various English courses are clustered.  Students come from all over Indonesia to take courses in the English Village, where it is common for people to speak with each other in English (rather than Indonesian or Javanese) for the sake of practice.

Administrative districts
The regency is divided into twenty-six districts (kecamatan), listed below with their areas and their populations at the 2010 census and the 2020 census.

Tourist attractions
Simpang Lima Gumul Monument
Gunung Kelud
Air Terjun Dolo
Air Terjun Irenggolo

References

External links

Kediri Regency official website